The National Soccer Hall of Fame is a private, non-profit institution established in 1979 that honors soccer achievements in the United States.  Induction into the hall is widely considered the highest honor in American soccer.

Key

Members

Players

Builders

See also
 National Soccer Hall of Fame

References
Inline citations

National Soccer Hall of Fame